Central Decatur Community School District is a rural public school district for Decatur County, Iowa, headquartered in the community of Leon, Iowa.  The district contains students from Decatur City, Grand River, Davis City, and Pleasanton. The district covers over 60% of Decatur County.

The average ACT score is 25 and over 95% of all students graduate high school. The colors are red and white, and the mascot is a cardinal.

District Administration 
Superintendent of Schools
Chris Coffelt

Schools
The district operates three schools, all in Leon:

South Elementary School grades pre-k through 2nd 
201 SE 6th Street

North Elementary School grades 3rd through 6th
1203 NE Poplar Street

Junior-Senior High School grades 7th through 12th
1201 NE Poplar Street

Central Decatur Junior-Senior High School

Athletics 
The Cardinals compete in the Pride of Iowa Conference.

Central Decatur fields teams in football, cross country, wrestling (with Lenox), boys and girls basketball,  bowling, golf, track and field, baseball, and softball.

See also
List of school districts in Iowa
List of high schools in Iowa

References

External links 

Central Decatur Junior-Senior High School
Welcome to Leon Iowa
Our Schools

School districts in Iowa
Education in Decatur County, Iowa